The Family Jams is an album featuring members of the Manson Family, a cult formed by Charles Manson. Recorded in or around 1969, the album was released in 1997. Although Charles Manson himself does not appear on any of the tracks, he is given writing credit for all of the songs. Most of the male vocals are sung by member Steve "Clem" Grogan. Other members appearing on the album are Sandra Good, Catherine "Gypsy" Share, Catherine "Cappy" Gillies, Nancy "Brenda" Pitman, and Ruth Ann "Ouisch" Moorehouse.

In 1997 it was released simultaneously on CD by both Transparency Records and Aoroa Records.

The first disc is the same music as a previously released white vinyl record called "Manson Family Sings the Songs of Charles Manson." This version, however, has been re-mastered for superior sound. The second disc contains new material and previously unreleased versions of the songs.

In late 1969, the Manson Family got everyone together, including Bruce Davis (then wanted by the FBI), in the Spahn Ranch saloon, to record music for Robert Hendrickson's Manson film. This was the beginning of the Family Jams, but the original audio tapes remain buried in a vault.

The album was recorded as the murder trial was ongoing, with the song "Get on Home" containing the eerie line referring to the killers carving crosses into their foreheads: "When you see the children with x's on their head, if you dare to look at them, soon you will be dead."

Marilyn Manson and the Spooky Kids has released an unrelated demo with the same title, but this is not to be confused with the Manson Family's album.

The British Doom Metal band Uncle Acid & the Deadbeats recorded a version of 'Get on Home' to use as a b-side for the single release of the song 'Mind Crawler' from their second album, 'Mind Control'.

Track listing

Disc one
"Ra-Hide Away!"
"Love's Death"
"Die to Be One"
"No Wrong-Come Along"
"Get on Home"
"Is There No One in Your World But You?"
"First They Made Me Sleep in the Closet/I'm Scratchin' Peace Symbols on Your Tombstone"
"Give Your Love (To Be Free)"
"I'll Never Say Never to Always"
"Look at Your Love"
"If I Had a Million Dollars"
"Goin' to the Church House"

Disc two
"A Gamblin' Man Come From Natchez"
"Ra-Hide Away"
"Die to Be One"
"The Fires Are Burning"
"Give Your Love (To Be Free)"
"The Young Will Overcome"
"Going to the Church House"
"Love's Death"
"I'll Never Say Never to Always"
"Die to Be One"
"Look at Your Love"
"I Can't Remember When"
"Going to the Church House"
"I Can't Remember When (Alternate)"
"Give Your Love to Be Free"
"London Bridge Is Falling Down"

References

1997 albums
Charles Manson albums